Gynacantha immaculifrons is a species of dragonfly in the family Aeshnidae. It is found in the Democratic Republic of the Congo, Malawi, and Tanzania. Its natural habitats are subtropical or tropical moist lowland forests and shrub-dominated wetlands. It is threatened by habitat loss.

References

Aeshnidae
Insects described in 1956
Taxonomy articles created by Polbot